Getafe Club de Fútbol "B" is the reserve team of Getafe CF, club based in Getafe, Madrid metropolitan area, in the namesake community. Founded in 1983, it currently plays in Tercera Federación – Group 7 holding home games at Ciudad Deportiva Getafe CF.

History
Getafe B was founded at the same time as the first team, in 1983, reaching the fourth division for the first time 11 years later and being relegated after just one season. In 1998 it returned again to the category, lasting three years and never finishing in higher than the 14th position.

In the 2004–05 campaign, as the main squad first appeared in La Liga, the reserves returned to the fourth level, going on to stabilize in that division in the following years. In 2010, after two unsuccessful playoff visits, the club promoted to level three for the first time ever. In the first season there the club reached 7th position among 20 teams. The 2011-12 season was slightly worse, as Getafe B finished in the 8th position. In the 2018-19 season Getafe B became the champion of the Tercera División, Group 7. The beginning of the season in Segunda División B was difficult, as the club won just 4 from the first 14 games.

Season to season
As Getafe Promesas

As Getafe CF B

8 seasons in Segunda División B
13 seasons in Tercera División
2 seasons in Tercera Federación

Current squad

From Youth Academy

Club officials

Current technical staff

Stadium
Getafe B holds home games at Ciudad Deportiva de Getafe, which has a 1,500-spectators capacity. It is located adjacent to the Coliseum Alfonso Pérez, the first team's grounds.

References

External links
Getafe CF official website 
Futbolme team profile 

Getafe CF
Football clubs in the Community of Madrid
Spanish reserve football teams
Association football clubs established in 1983
1983 establishments in Spain